Pelkan may refer to:

Pelkan-e Olya
Pelkan-e Sofla